Kemal Kılıçdaroğlu, leader of the Republican People's Party and İzmir deputy, became the joint presidential candidate of the Nation Alliance in the 2023 Turkish presidential election.

Background 
Kemal Kılıçdaroğlu, who was elected as the leader of the Republican People's Party in 2010, did not run for the presidency in the 2014 and 2018 elections. He hinted for the first time that he could run for the presidency in the 2023 election during the budget discussions in the Turkish Grand National Assembly in December 2020. Later, he made other statements stating that he could be a candidate on different dates. For Ekrem İmamoğlu and Mansur Yavaş, the mayors of Istanbul and Ankara, who are among the possible candidates of the CHP, Kılıçdaroğlu's statement that they should continue their duties and their support for Kılıçdaroğlu paved the way for Kılıçdaroğlu's candidacy.

The Table of Six, formed by the expansion of the Nation Alliance, discussed the joint presidential candidate for the first time at its 11th meeting on 26 January 2023. While the joint candidate was scheduled to be announced on 13 February, the nomination process was postponed due to the 2023 Turkey–Syria earthquake on 6 February that affected 11 provinces. At the Table of Six meeting on 2 March, it was announced that a consensus was reached on the joint candidate and the candidate would be announced on March 6. Upon the Good Party's General Administrative Board's opposition to Kılıçdaroğlu's candidacy, Chairman Meral Akşener called for candidacy for İmamoğlu and Yavaş. İmamoğlu and Yavaş responded negatively to this call and declared that they support Kılıçdaroğlu. Later, the Good Party supported Kılıçdaroğlu's candidacy in exchange for İmamoğlu and Yavaş being the vice president along with the five leaders of the Table of Six, and after the Table meeting on 6 March, Kılıçdaroğlu was announced as the joint candidate.

Campaign 

After it was announced that he was the joint candidate of the Nation Alliance, Kılıçdaroğlu made a speech in front of the CHP Headquarters. On 7 March, at the parliamentary group meeting, the party announced that he was leaving the group presidency. On 10 March, Kılıçdaroğlu  went to the earthquake zone, visited Malatya and Kahramanmaraş, and spent the night in a tent in Nurhak. The candidacy launch, which was planned to be held on 12 March, was postponed as it had not been forty days since the earthquake. On the same day, a video containing sections of Kılıçdaroğlu's speeches was shared from the official social media accounts of the CHP. Kılıçdaroğlu held the first meeting in Hatay on 14 March after he left the group presidency. He went to Şanlıurfa, where there was a flood on 15 March. He went to Northern Cyprus on 16 March and visited the families of Cypriot students who died in the Kahramanmaraş earthquakes. Kılıçdaroğlu, who met with the Workers' Party of Turkey and the Left Party three days before the announcement of his candidacy, announced that he would meet on 17 March in the Independent Turkey Party and the National Road Party.

References 

Election campaigns in Turkey
2023 Turkish presidential election